Judas' Kiss (Spanish:El beso de Judas) is a 1954 Spanish religious drama film directed by Rafael Gil and starring Rafael Rivelles, Francisco Rabal and Gérard Tichy.

Plot 
It tells the story of Judas Iscariot (Rafael Rivelles) with the famous kiss of him betraying Jesus to the Romans in exchange for a few coins. The magazines of the time rapturously described the spectacular nature of El beso de Judas, rarely seen before in Spanish cinema, not even in Alba de América, by Juan de Orduña, which in the end had been shot with severe budget cuts. Eighty-two sets, exteriors shot in the Holy Land (Rafael Gil moved there with a film crew in the summer of 1953 and the images would later be used in long shots or on transparencies of the film), a brilliant cast and – above all – An interesting plot idea characterized El beso de Judas: narrating the story of Jesus from the point of view of Judas. The journalist Barreira ended one of his reports by pointing out: "Never was such a gigantic film presented in Spain, a display of presentation as was required in this one, dealing with the exalted theme of the crucifixion of Christ."  

The idea of telling the drama of Judas (which had already been dealt with in El Judas, directed in 1952 by Ignacio F. Iquino, albeit in the form of the actors of a living Passion that is performed in a town in Catalonia) goes back in the summer of 1952. Escrivá presented the project to United Artists, which received it enthusiastically, guaranteeing optimal distribution in numerous American countries. With this guarantee, no expense was spared when it came to structuring spectacular scenes inspired by the American model of the great Cecil B. De Mille (although the black and white of The Kiss of Judas has aesthetic, and even dramatic, concomitance with the version of the life of Christ that Julien Duvivier had filmed in 1935 with his Golgotha). 

Enrique Alarcón in artistic direction and Alfredo Fraile in photography, both regular collaborators with Gil, achieved one of their best works in a production that also featured Cristóbal Halffter in the solemn and adjusted music that accompanied the images, and in the montage with José Antonio Rojo, another frequent collaborator of the director whose work is living history of Spanish cinema.

Cast
  Rafael Rivelles  as Judas  
 Francisco Rabal  as Quinto Licinio  
 Gérard Tichy  as Poncio Pilato  
 Fernando Sancho as Padre del condenado  
 José Nieto as Jesús  
 Manuel Monroy as Pedro  
 Félix Dafauce as Misael  
 Francisco Arenzana  as Dimas  
 Gabriel Alcover 
 Pedro Anzola 
 Luis Hurtado  
 Mercedes Albert  
 Jacinto San Emeterio as Hombre frente a la cruz  
 Santiago Rivero as Hombre frente a la cruz  
 Tony Hernández
 Ricardo Turia 
 Manuel Kayser as Líder multitud  
 José Villasante as Gestas  
 Rafael Bardem as Hombre que prepara cena  
 Esther Rambal 
 Ruth Moly 
 Mercedes Serrano 
 José Manuel Martín 
 Eugenio Domingo as Hijo de Acad el leproso 
 Germán Cobos 
 Arturo Fernández as Santiago  
 Milagros Leal as Mujer que da información a Judas

References

Bibliography 
 Bentley, Bernard. A Companion to Spanish Cinema. Boydell & Brewer 2008.

External links 
 

1954 drama films
Spanish drama films
1954 films
1950s Spanish-language films
Films directed by Rafael Gil
Cifesa films
Films shot in Almería
Spanish black-and-white films
1950s Spanish films